Austrosassia ponderi is a species of predatory sea snail, a marine gastropod mollusk in the family Cymatiidae.

References

 Beu, A.G., 1987. A Taxonomy of the gastropods of the families Ranellidae (=Cymatiidae) and Bursidae. Part 2. Description of 14 new modern Indo-West Pacific species and subspecies, with revision of related Taxa. New Zealand Journal of Zoology 13: 273-355, 274 figs

Cymatiidae